Hitendra Vishnu Thakur (born 3 October 1961) is an Indian politician from Virar, Maharashtra, India. He is the president of Bahujan Vikas Aaghadi, political party in the Vasai-Virar region of Maharashtra, India. He is the incumbent Member of Legislative Assembly (MLA) for Vasai (Vidhan Sabha constituency) in Palghar district of Maharashtra. His family controls the Viva Group of Companies and Viva Trust which owns the Viva College located in Virar.

Political life

Hitendra Thakur started his political career in 1988 when elected the President of the Vasai Taluka Youth Congress. Two years later, in the Maharashtra State Assembly elections in 1990, he was elected MLA for Vasai-Virar from the Indian National Congress at the age of 29. Later, he formed his own political party named Vasai Vikas Mandal which was changed to Bahujan Vikas Aaghadi and won 3 subsequent elections as well.

His political party, Bahujan Vikas Aaghadi (BVA) currently holds majority in the Vasai Virar Municipal Corporation (VVMC), Vasai Taluka Panchayat Samiti and various Gram Panchayats in the region. As such he helped Vasant Davkhare get the post of Deputy Chairman of the Maharashtra Legislative Council three times and Govinda (a Bollywood star and a close friend) win the Mumbai North seat in 2004 General elections.

Personal life 

Thakur was born on 3 October 1961 in Virar , district Palghar (formerly Thane district) in Maharashtra, India in a middle class Hindu family hailing originally from palghar . He did his schooling in Virar and later graduated from the Vartak College in Vasai. While studying in the Vartak College, Vasai, he was elected at the post of general secretary of the student council.

In mid-2009 his elder son, Kshitij Thakur won Nalasopara seat. His wife Pravina Thakur became the first female Mayor of Vasai-Virar after his party swept the Vasai Virar Municipal Corporation polls by winning 106 seats. His son has graduated from London School of Business.

Criticism and Controversies

On 3 July 2009, the Government of Maharashtra had issued a notification for inclusion of 53 villages in the newly formed Vasai-Virar Municipal Corporation. However 49 of the 53 villages had opposed the merger citing environmental and heritage issues and refused the move by forming the Gao Bachao Andolan Samiti under the guidance of Vivek Pandit, longtime opposition candidate of Hitendra Thakur. Thakur had allegedly influenced the police to arrest and assault Vivek Pandit for the same.

Criminal cases and financial assets

His candidate affidavits filed as a candidate in the 2014 Maharashtra Legislative Assembly election, show that Thakur has 8 criminal cases against him (7 where charges are framed, 1 where cognizance is taken, 0 where convicted).
 

References

Living people
1961 births
Indian National Congress politicians
Bahujan Vikas Aghadi politicians
Maharashtra MLAs 2004–2009
Maharashtra MLAs 1990–1995
Maharashtra MLAs 1995–1999
Maharashtra MLAs 1999–2004
People from Thane district
People from Virar
Maharashtra MLAs 2014–2019
Maharashtra MLAs 2019–2024